Abel Mathías Hernández Platero (born 8 August 1990) is a Uruguayan professional footballer who plays as a striker for Peñarol.

Hernández began his career with Central Español and Peñarol, and spent five-and-a-half seasons in Italy with Palermo before joining Hull City for a club record £10 million in September 2014. Four years later, he joined CSKA Moscow, and upon his release signed for Al Ahli in 2019. After was released by the Qatari club a year later, he moved to Brazil, first joining Internacional and later on Fluminense.

A full international since 2010, Hernández has competed at various international tournaments with Uruguay, including their victory at the 2011 Copa América.

Club career

Early career
Nicknamed La Joya, he started his professional career with Uruguayan side Central Español, immediately scoring five goals in his first four games. He was subsequently acquired by Peñarol, where he played a handful of games and also gained a spot into the Under-20 Uruguayan side.

Palermo
On 2 February 2009, Italian Serie A club Palermo completed the signing of Hernández, where he joined fellow Uruguayan Edinson Cavani. He was presented by Palermo only one month later, due to some health concerns regarding a cardiac arrhythmia that led to a small surgical intervention. He made his first team debut on 15 March, replacing Edinson Cavani in the final minutes of a 5–2 home win to Lecce. He then won the Trofeo Giacinto Facchetti with the Primavera under-19 team in June 2009.

After missing the initial weeks of the 2009–10 Serie A due to injury and his participation in the 2009 FIFA U-20 World Cup. Hernández played his first game on 29 October 2009. Coming on as a half-time substitute for Cristian Melinte, he scored in the 5–3 loss to league leaders Internazionale.

In 2012–13, Hernández scored only 1 goal in 14 league matches as Palermo suffered relegation. He equalised as a substitute against Udinese in the 81st minute of a home match on 8 May, only for Medhi Benatia to score a winner for the visitors two minutes later. The following campaign, he struck 14 times in 28 Serie B games as the Sicilians returned to the top flight, netting braces in away victories over Padova and Siena, both of which included a penalty kick.

Hull City

Hernández signed for English club Hull City on 1 September 2014 for a club record £10 million on a three-year contract, with the club having an option for a fourth year. Two weeks later he made his debut at the KC Stadium, and scored the first goal of a 2–2 draw with West Ham United. In his next home game against Manchester City on the 27th, he won a penalty after being fouled in the area by Eliaquim Mangala, and scored it in an eventual 2–4 defeat. His next goal came when he put his team into the lead during a 2–2 away draw against Arsenal.

Hull were relegated on 24 May 2015 after a goalless draw with Manchester United on the final day of the season. During the match, Hérnandez punched United defender Phil Jones in an off-the-ball incident, not seen by match officials. Two days later, he was charged with violent conduct by The Football Association and subsequently given a three-match ban.

On 16 January 2016, in a Championship match against Charlton Athletic, Hernández scored his first club career hat-trick in a game that finished 6–0, taking his league tally to 14 goals for the season. With six goals in four matches, he won January's Football League Championship Player of the Month, and his manager Steve Bruce won the equivalent. At the club's annual awards, held on 3 May 2016, Hernández was named Player of the Year and Players' Player of the Year.

In January 2017, Hernández missed two penalties in the space of two minutes in a FA Cup fourth round match verses Fulham. His first spot kick was saved by Fulham goalkeeper Marcus Bettinelli before Bettinelli brought-down Hernández while he attempted to reach the rebound. Hernández stepped up once more and was again denied by Bettinelli.

During the 2017–18 season, Hernández ruptured his Achilles tendon against Wolverhampton Wanderers, the injury would keep Hernandez out for several months. He returned from injury on 6 March 2018 against Millwall, scoring in a 2–1 defeat. He finished the season with eight goals in just ten appearances.

Hernández was offered a new contract by Hull at the end of the 2017–18 season. However, on 4 June, Hernández and Hull City announced he would be leaving the club upon his contract expiry after failing to reach an agreement on signing a new contract offer. He then held discussions with Leeds United over a potential move.

CSKA Moscow
On 1 August 2018, Russian Premier League club CSKA Moscow announced the signing of Hernández on a three-year contract. He scored his first goal in Russia on 11 August 2018 in his second match in the league, converting the penalty kick to secure an away 1–1 draw against Yenisey Krasnoyarsk. In his next match, on 18 August, he scored again and provided an assist in a 3–0 victory over Arsenal Tula. He played as a 2nd half substitute in CSKA's shock 3–0 win against Real Madrid at the Santiago Bernabeu in the Champions League. The defeat was Real Madrid's heaviest defeat in Europe at home in their history.

After making only 15 appearances due to injuries, he was released from his contract by mutual consent on 27 May 2019.

Al Ahli
Hernández was linked with Nottingham Forest after his release from the Russian capital, but instead signed for Al Ahli SC of the Qatar Stars League, believing that the move would help him back into the national team.

Internacional
On 28 August 2020, Hernández joined Campeonato Brasileiro club Internacional on a free transfer, signing a one-year contract.

International career

On 27 July 2010, Hernández was called up for his debut with Uruguay, a friendly against Angola in Lisbon. The game, which was played on 11 August, ended in a 2–0 win for Uruguay, with Hernández being fouled for the penalty, which was scored by Edinson Cavani. Hernández then scored the second goal for the Celeste during injury time. He was part of the Uruguayan team which won the 2011 Copa América in Argentina, making substitute appearances in their opening match and their semi-final victory, both against Peru. He was chosen by Óscar Tabárez for the London 2012 Olympic Uruguay squad, making a half-time substitute appearance in the 0–2 defeat to Senegal at Wembley Stadium, in an eventual group stage exit.

The following year, Hernández was selected for Uruguay's squad at the 2013 FIFA Confederations Cup. In his only appearance, the final group stage match against Tahiti, Hernández scored a first-half hat-trick and went on to become the fourth player in Confederations Cup history to score four goals in one match after converting a second-half penalty goal in Uruguay's 8–0 victory. He was named man of the match for this performance. Hernández was also included in the Uruguayan squad for the 2014 FIFA World Cup, making substitute appearances in their opener against Costa Rica and round of 16 match against Colombia, both defeats. At the 2015 Copa América, he made one start and two substitute appearances as Uruguay reached the quarter-finals.

Hernández who was a regular in his national team squads, had just recovered from injury towards the end of the 2017–18 season, missed out on a 2018 World Cup squad place on 16 May 2018, with Edinson Cavani, Luis Suárez, Cristhian Stuani and Maxi Gómez favoured ahead of him.

Career statistics

Club

International

International goals
As of match played 13 June 2016. Uruguay score listed first, score column indicates score after each Hernández goal.

Honours

Club
Palermo
Serie B: 2013–14

Hull City
Football League Championship play-offs: 2016

International
Uruguay
Copa América: 2011

Individual
South American U-20 Championship joint top scorer: 2009
Football League Championship Player of the Month: January 2016

References

External links

1990 births
Living people
People from Pando, Uruguay
Uruguayan footballers
Association football forwards
Peñarol players
Central Español players
Palermo F.C. players
Hull City A.F.C. players
PFC CSKA Moscow players
Al Ahli SC (Doha) players
Sport Club Internacional players
Fluminense FC players
Atlético San Luis footballers
Uruguayan Primera División players
Serie A players
Serie B players
Premier League players
English Football League players
Russian Premier League players
Qatar Stars League players
Campeonato Brasileiro Série A players
Liga MX players
Uruguay youth international footballers
Uruguay under-20 international footballers
Olympic footballers of Uruguay
Uruguay international footballers
2011 Copa América players
Footballers at the 2012 Summer Olympics
2013 FIFA Confederations Cup players
2014 FIFA World Cup players
2015 Copa América players
Copa América Centenario players
Copa América-winning players
Uruguayan expatriate footballers
Uruguayan expatriate sportspeople in Italy
Uruguayan expatriate sportspeople in England
Uruguayan expatriate sportspeople in Russia
Uruguayan expatriate sportspeople in Qatar
Uruguayan expatriate sportspeople in Brazil
Uruguayan expatriate sportspeople in Mexico
Expatriate footballers in Italy
Expatriate footballers in England
Expatriate footballers in Russia
Expatriate footballers in Qatar
Expatriate footballers in Brazil
Expatriate footballers in Mexico